A trench coat or trenchcoat is a variety of coat made of waterproof heavy-duty fabric, originally developed for British Army officers before the First World War, and becoming popular while used in the trenches. 

Originally made from gabardine, a worsted wool fabric waterproofed using lanolin before weaving, the traditional colour of a trench coat was khaki.

Traditionally trench coats are double-breasted with 10 front buttons, wide lapels, a storm flap, and pockets that button-close. The coat is belted at the waist with a self-belt, with raglan sleeves ending in cuff straps around the wrists that also buckle, to keep water from running down the forearm when using binoculars in the rain. The coat often has epaulets that button-close, which were functional in a military context.

The trench coat was typically worn as a windbreaker or as a rain jacket, and not for sole protection from the cold in winter. Although some may feature a removable wool liner for additional warmth, they are usually not as warm as an overcoat. Period advertisements from the First World War reveal that the trench coat was sized to wear over the British Warm, to offer water protection when the temperature was cold enough to require the heavier coat, which explains the traditionally generous sizing of trench coats. Makers in recent years have resized trench coats downwards to conform more closely to overcoat sizing, as two coats would rarely be worn together today.

Popularised by film stars such as Humphrey Bogart, and Peter Sellers in the Pink Panther films, the trench coat has become a fashion staple, available in many colours, through brands such as Burberry.

History

First World War
The trench coat was developed as an alternative to the heavy serge greatcoats worn by British and French soldiers in the First World War. Invention of the trench coat is claimed by two British luxury clothing manufacturers, Burberry and Aquascutum, with Aquascutum's claim dating back to the 1850s. Thomas Burberry had invented gabardine fabric in 1879 and submitted a design for a British Army officer's raincoat to the War Office in 1901.

The trench coat became an optional item of dress in the British Army, and was obtained by private purchase by officers and Warrant Officers Class I who were under no obligation to own them. No other ranks were permitted to wear them. Another optional item was the British Warm, a wool coat similar to the greatcoat that was shorter in length, also worn by British officers and Warrant Officers Class I as an optional piece.

During the First World War, the design of the trench coat was modified to include epaulettes and D-rings. The shoulder straps were for the attachment of epaulettes or other rank insignia; the D-ring was originally used for attaching map cases, swords, or other equipment to the belt, and there is a popular myth that it was for the attachment of hand grenades. 

This latter design was dubbed "trench coat" by the soldiers in the front line. Many trench coats had large pockets for maps, and cleverly placed flaps and vents to deal with the odour associated with earlier rubber coats. 

A range of waterproof coats was designed and sold during wartime that incorporated War Office requirements with traditional aspects of leisurewear. What became known as the "trench coat" combined the features of a military waterproof cape and the regulation greatcoat designed for British officers. Many veterans returning to civilian life kept the coats, which became fashionable for both men and women.

Second World War 

During the Second World War, officers of the United Kingdom continued to use the trench coat on the battlefield in inclement weather. Other nations also developed trench coat style jackets, notably the United States and the Soviet Union, and other armies of continental Europe such as Belgium, France, Germany, Greece, the Netherlands, Poland (and are often seen in war zone photographs in the 1939-40 era, even worn by troops on the attack), although as the war progressed, in the field shorter "field jackets" became more popular, including garments such as the Denison smock used by British commandos, paratroopers, and snipers and the M1941/M1943 field jackets used by the US Army. These garments were shorter and more practical than the trench coat, and as such they allowed the wearer to be more mobile.

Later
Trench coats have remained fashionable in the decades following the Second World War. Their original role as part of an army officer's uniform lent the trench coat a businesslike respectability, although many prefer to tie the belt in front (rather than use the buckle) to project a more casual look than strict military dress. Humphrey Bogart's Rick Blaine from Casablanca and Peter Sellers' Inspector Clouseau wore the trench coat in the public eye. Often, a fedora or an ushanka (during colder weather) was also worn. In the 1960s, radical intellectuals wore trench coats over black turtleneck sweaters, while some Mods wore trench coats as fashionable overcoats, as an alternative to the fishtail parka or Crombie. Streakers and flashers often prefer trench coats since they conceal the wearers’ lack of undergarments and can be opened quickly when the exhibitionists are ready to expose themselves.

While similar, the heavy metal and Goth fashion trend of black oilcloth dusters are incorrectly referred to as trench coats. Early media reports of the 1999 Columbine High School massacre initially associated the perpetrators (Eric Harris and Dylan Klebold) with members of the "Trenchcoat Mafia", a group of outliers who allegedly wore conspicuous black Australian oilcloth dusters. In the copycat W. R. Myers High School shooting days later, it was rumoured the shooter had worn a trench coat. In the wake of these incidents, many public schools in the US forbade students from wearing trench coats, both because of their cultural associations and on the grounds that they could be used to conceal weapons.

Popular culture
Doctor Who involved trench coats being worn by the Doctor during their fourth, war, thirteenth, and fourteenth incarnations. One was also worn by Sacha Dhawan's version of the Master when posing as a Nazi on the episode Spyfall. Some were also worn by their companion Sarah Jane Smith in The Sarah Jane Adventures, and also by Amy Pond in the episode Vincent and the Doctor and Tegan Jovanka in the episode The Power of the Doctor.
Trenchcoats were worn by the title character of Sherlock. 
The movie version of the Harry Potter franchise featured trench coats worn by Hermione Granger.
The Marvel Cinematic Universe features Colonel Nick Fury wearing a single-breasted trench coat of black leather. The film Captain America: The First Avenger features Obergruppenführer/Lieutenant General Johann Schmidt wearing black leather trench coats during World War 2. 
 A brown trench coat is worn by the demonic hero Hellboy.
 Trench coats were worn by Captain Blackadder, Lieutenant George, Baldrick, Captain Darling, General Melchett, Squadron Leader  Lord Flashheart, and The Red Baron. 
 Transformers: Age of Extinction and Transformers: The Last Knight features Crosshairs, a cocky Autobot paratrooper and sniper wearing a green trench coat which enables him to fly with help from parachutes.
 X-Men Origins: Wolverine features Sabretooth wearing a black trench coat.
 Two versions of the Joker wore purple trench coats on The Dark Knight and Suicide Squad.
 In the 1989 teen movie Say Anything..., main character Lloyd Dobler (played by John Cusack) famously wore a brown trench coat.
 In the 1967 neo-noir crime thriller Le Samouraï, main character Jef Costello (played by Alain Delon) wore a beige trench coat.

See also
 Coat (clothing)
 War Doctor
 Fourth Doctor
 Thirteenth Doctor
 World War 1
 World War 2
 The Cold War

References

External links 
 
Difference between Trench Coat and Overcoat

Coats (clothing)
History of clothing (Western fashion)
History of fashion